Cephaloon ungulare is a species of false longhorn beetle in the family Stenotrachelidae. It is found in North America.

References

 Poole, Robert W., and Patricia Gentili, eds. (1996). "Coleoptera". Nomina Insecta Nearctica: A Check List of the Insects of North America, vol. 1: Coleoptera, Strepsiptera, 41-820.
 Young, Daniel K. / Arnett, Ross H. Jr., Michael C. Thomas, Paul E. Skelley, and J. H. Frank, eds. (2002). "Family 110. Stenotrachelidae Thomson 1859". American Beetles, vol. 2: Polyphaga: Scarabaeoidea through Curculionoidea, 520–521.

Further reading

 Arnett, R.H. Jr., M. C. Thomas, P. E. Skelley and J. H. Frank. (eds.). (2002). American Beetles, Volume II: Polyphaga: Scarabaeoidea through Curculionoidea. CRC Press LLC, Boca Raton, FL.
 Arnett, Ross H. (2000). American Insects: A Handbook of the Insects of America North of Mexico. CRC Press.
 Richard E. White. (1983). Peterson Field Guides: Beetles. Houghton Mifflin Company.

Tenebrionoidea
Beetles described in 1874